The 2018–19 Alaska Anchorage Seawolves men's ice hockey season was the 40th season of play for the program, the 35th at the Division I level and the 26th in the WCHA conference. The Seawolves represented the University of Alaska Anchorage and were coached by Matt Curley, in his 1st season.

Season
Any hope that the Seawolves would improve under new head coach Matt Curley were quickly banished when Alaska Anchorage dropped the opener 2–10. While they recovered to win the rematch a day later, the team's offense was too inept to get a second win for over two months. Alaska Anchorage had one of the worst offensive performances in the history of NCAA hockey, scoring just 40 goals in 34 games, and were shut out 11 times during the season. Throughout the season, the team struggled to even get chances on goal, averaging just over 22 shots per game while surrendering nearly 32 attempts on their own goal. Perhaps making the situation worse, Alaska Anchorage squandered many good performances by their goaltenders, who gave the team numerous chances to win, including two 0–0 finishes.

Despite producing the worst season in program history, Alaska Anchorage retained Curley as their head coach.

Departures

Recruiting

Roster

Standings

Schedule and results

|-
!colspan=12 style=";" | Exhibition

|-
!colspan=12 style=";" | Regular Season

Scoring statistics

Goaltending statistics

Rankings

USCHO did not release a poll in Week 25.

References

Alaska Anchorage Seawolves men's ice hockey seasons
Alaska Anchorage Seawolves
Alaska Anchorage Seawolves
2019 in sports in Alaska
2018 in sports in Alaska